The Laredo World Trade Port of Entry is located at the World Trade International Bridge (sometimes referred to as "Bridge IV").  It was built in 2000 in an effort to relieve traffic from the congested downtown Laredo bridges.  All of Laredo's cross-border commercial vehicle traffic uses this Port of Entry, as the other Laredo bridges prohibit trucks.  Passenger vehicles and pedestrians are not permitted to use this crossing.

References

See also

 List of Mexico–United States border crossings
 List of Canada–United States border crossings

Mexico–United States border crossings
2000 establishments in Texas
Buildings and structures in Laredo, Texas
Buildings and structures completed in 2000
Road bridges in Texas